The 2017–18 Melbourne Renegades season is the seventh in the club's history. Coached by Andrew McDonald and captained by Aaron Finch, they competed in the BBL's 2017–18 season.

Fixtures

Pre-season

Regular season

Knockout phase

Semi final

Ladder

Squad information
The following is the Renegades men squad for the 2017–18 Big Bash League season as of 28 January 2018.

Transfers

In:

Out:

Season statistics

Most runs

Source: ESPNcricinfo, 3 February 2018

Most wickets 

Source: ESPNcricinfo, 3 February 2018

Home attendance

TV audience
BBL games are currently broadcast in Australia by the free-to-air channel Network Ten.

Following are the television ratings for the Melbourne Renegades's 2017–18 BBL season matches in Australia.

References

External links
 Official website of the Melbourne Renegades
 Official website of the Big Bash League

Melbourne Renegades seasons